Olathe Northwest High School is a public high school located in Olathe, Kansas, United States, serving students in grades 9–12. The school is one of five high schools in the Olathe USD 233 school district. The school colors are blue, black, and white, and the school mascot is the Raven.
Olathe Northwest was established in 2003 to help educate the rapidly increasing population of Olathe. Olathe Northwest is a member of the Kansas State High School Activities Association and offers a variety of sports programs. Athletic teams compete in the 6A division and are known as the "Ravens". Extracurricular activities are also offered in the form of performing arts, school publications, and clubs.

History
Olathe Northwest High School was established in 2003 and celebrated its 10th school year with a homecoming event on September 21, 2013.

Academics
Olathe Northwest achieved the Kansas State Department of Education "Standard of Excellence" for the 2011–12 school year.

Classroom technology
When the school first opened, students were issued a Palm M515 model Personal digital assistant. After three years of use, those palms were deemed obsolete, and the district upgraded the school to the Palm TX. Over the next few years, the school gradually phased out this program, and students are no longer issued PDAs. The school also uses ceiling-mounted projectors and Smart boards for classroom presentations. Students are now able to bring in their own personal device and use it on the school's wireless network.

e-Communication
Students in the e-Communication program, or e-Comm, have opportunities to advance their interests in web design, video production (entertainment and convergence journalism), graphic design and animation. The school is equipped with a television studio, numerous video editing suites, and several computer lab classrooms with the latest large display Apple iMac computers equipped with industry standard software for all strands of e-Comm. The e-Comm program allows students to experience each different strand, then pick a strand on which to focus. e-Comm engages students and helps to give them a foundation in their chosen strand. e-Comm even offers students a chance to enter in a multimedia festival called eMagine created and run by the e-Communication program.

Engineering Academy
Students in the Engineering Academy are immersed in nearly every major engineering discipline through a wide array of coursework including a materials and processing chemistry course and CAD courses during their sophomore year, as well as additional CAD coursework along with a paired physics and mathematics/project course. During their senior year students have the options of joining a senior project including the Battlebots project team, the Electrathon project team, an internship with a local business, the service-based course Engineer a Better World, or the FIRST Robotics team.

Extracurricular activities

The Ravens compete in the Sunflower League and are classified as a 6A school, the largest classification in Kansas according to the Kansas State High School Activities Association. A few graduates have gone on to participate in Division I, Division II, and Division III athletics.

Athletics

Baseball
In 2007, the ONW baseball team became co-Sunflower League champions for the first time in school history. The team finished with a record of 12–8.  The squad reached the Regional Championship game in 2004 and 2005 but fell one game short of the state tournament each time. In the 2003–04 season, the Ravens entered into regional play as the bottom seed and drew Mill Valley High School, the  1 team in 5A. The Ravens defeated Mill Valley in one of the biggest upsets in Kansas high school baseball history.

Bowling
The 2014–15 and 2016–17 bowling men's varsity team won the city competition, beating cross-town rivals Olathe North.

Boys' basketball
In 2017, the Raven boys' basketball team qualified for the state tournament for the first time in school history.

Football
In 2004, the first year of varsity play, the ONW football team went 2–7. The next year, they improved to 4–5. The 2006 squad finished 3–7 and made the playoffs for the first time in school history.  The 2014 team had the program's first winning record and beat cross-town rival Olathe East for the first time in school history.

Girls' basketball 
The Lady Ravens broke a couple of records in their 2015 season, but they did not enjoy the way it ended with a 51–45 loss to Blue Valley in sub state, finishing with a 9–12 record. Their records include most three-pointers made in state, with seventeen, and most three-pointers attempted, with forty-three.

Softball
In 2009, the Lady Ravens girls' softball team compiled a perfect 25–0 regular season record. The team continued on to win the 2009 Kansas State High School Championship title against Washburn Rural High School. In May 2011, entering the postseason as the number 6 seed in 6A, the Ravens captured their second title, beating Washburn Rural 9–1. In 2017, the Lady Ravens won their third state championship.

Tennis

In 2006, sophomore J.T. Christian won the 6A State Championship in boys singles. After graduating from ONW, Christian played tennis at Marquette University and Creighton University.

Wrestling 
The 2014–15 ONW wrestling team placed 12th in the state – their best finish to date. Six wrestlers from the 2014–2015 squad qualified for state, three of whom placed.

Volleyball
In 2010, the girls' varsity team went 11–0 in the Sunflower League and claimed the first league championship in team history.

The Lady Ravens won back-to-back state championships in 2016 and 2017.

State championships

Non-athletic programs

Publications
Evermore is the school yearbook, run by a large staff that distributes the book during the summer. Undefined was also a literary magazine published until 2007 when the class was terminated due to low enrollment. A new literary magazine, the Aviary, was started in late 2015, but is no longer in production. Journalism 1 and photojournalism classes are also offered.

In 2007, the department was awarded the "First Amendment Press Freedom Award" in Denver by the Journalism Education Association. Also in 2007, The Raven's Beak was nominated for the prestigious NSPA "Pacemaker" award, known as the nation's top prize in scholastic journalism, and was the first high-school newspaper in the Olathe School District to earn this honor. Evermore was also awarded a "Best in Show" at the 2007 JEA/NSPA Fall National High School Journalism Convention in Philadelphia. In September 2008, it was announced that The Raven's Beak was nominated for a Pacemaker for a second straight year by the NSPA. On November 15 at the NSPA Conference in St. Louis, Missouri, The Raven's Beak won the Pacemaker, the first Olathe school to take home the honor.

ONW NOW
ONW NOW is a weekly 10-minute school news broadcast produced by Olathe Northwest students as part of the e-Communication program. The program is aired to the school on Thursdays, during the "seminar" period, in which the entire student body watches. The show consists of five minutes of daily announcements along with news packages about school and community-related events, and five minutes of a sports news show, titled GameDay: Northwest started in 2011.

In 2008, ONW NOW produced their first live show on April 4, after previously using a "live to tape" format.

Band
The Olathe Northwest band program includes over two hundred students. There are four concert ensembles: the Concert Band, Symphonic Band, audition-only Wind Ensemble, and an audition-only Raven Winds, the latter three forming the marching band during the fall. A 6A division Kansas school, ONW has the most band ensembles in the district, boasting 10 organized groups. The school’s marching band is known as the "Raven Pride Marching Band" and has performed at football, basketball, and volleyball games as well as in school spirit assemblies. Their field shows have been "Sir Elton John" (2013), "The Sound Of Music" (2014), "Let Freedom Ring" (2015)  which won the Neowollah Marching Festival, "Turandot" (2016) which earned them the Grand Champions title at the 2016 Heart of America Marching Festival, "The Raven" (2017), "From One... Many" (2018), which won the Grand Champion title at the 2018 UCM Festival of Champions, “Pulse” (2019), “Warrior” (2020 & 2021), and “Into the Starry Night” (2022), winning the Grand Champion title at the 2022 Shawnee Mission High School Marching Band Invitational. In November 2014, the marching band traveled to New York City and marched in the annual Veteran's Day Parade. In May 2018, the Raven Pride Marching Band represented Kansas in the national Memorial Day Parade in Washington D.C.. The band most recently traveled to Orlando, Fl, where they performed at Walt Disney World in the 50th anniversary parade.  they are the largest band in the state of Kansas. Olathe Northwest also has a very successful Jazz program. The four jazz ensembles are: Raven Jazz I, II, III, and IV (Lab). Olathe Northwest has more jazz ensembles than any school in the area. Raven Jazz I won the "Basically Basie" Competition at KCKCC in 2015, 2017, and 2018. They also traveled to the 2018 KMEA All-State Convention in Wichita, Kansas; where they performed for the first time in school history. The Raven Jazz I ensemble also qualified as a finalist in the 2021 Essentially Ellington competition by Jazz at Lincoln Center.

Debate and forensics
In 2007, the team of Alex Parkinson and Jesi Egan won the two-speaker state championship in policy debate. Parkinson and Egan also won back-to-back Debate Coaches Invitational titles in 2006 and 2007. Parkinson went on to debate at Harvard, where he earned numerous honors, including second speaker at the National Debate Tournament in 2011.

At the 2014 NSDA National Tournament, senior Alaina Walberg was named the Phyllis Flory Barton Top Speaker in policy debate.

As of May 14, 2018, Olathe Northwest is ranked third in Kansas and 27th in the nation for speech and debate.

Orchestra 
The Olathe Northwest Orchestra program is split into three separate orchestras: the Freshmen Orchestra (open to freshmen), the Concert Orchestra (open to sophomores through seniors), and the Chamber/Advanced Orchestra (open to sophomores through seniors by audition). The Olathe Northwest Orchestra has four major performances in each school year. The members have also traveled and performed in Chicago, Boston, the Disney Festival at the EPCOT Center in Orlando, Florida, and the Kennedy Center in Washington, D.C.

Notable alumni 
 Willie Cauley-Stein, professional basketball player for the Sacramento Kings, Golden State Warriors, and Dallas Mavericks
 Shavon Shields, professional basketball player for the Fraport Skyliners

See also
 List of high schools in Kansas
 List of unified school districts in Kansas
Other high schools in Olathe USD 233 school district
 Olathe East High School in Olathe
 Olathe North High School in Olathe
 Olathe South High School in Olathe
 Olathe West High School in Olathe

References

External links
 
 Olathe USD 233 School District

Public high schools in Kansas
Education in Olathe, Kansas
Schools in Johnson County, Kansas
Buildings and structures in Olathe, Kansas
2003 establishments in Kansas
Educational institutions established in 2003